Paleoamphiuma is an extinct genus of prehistoric salamanders. It is known from the Green River Formation in Wyoming, the United States.

See also
 Prehistoric amphibian
 List of prehistoric amphibians

References

Cenozoic salamanders
Prehistoric amphibian genera
Paleogene amphibians of North America
Fossil taxa described in 1998